Edward James McShane (May 10, 1904 – June 1, 1989) was an American mathematician noted for his advancements of the calculus of variations, integration theory, stochastic calculus, and exterior ballistics.
His name is associated with the McShane–Whitney extension theorem and McShane integral.
McShane was professor of mathematics at the University of Virginia, president of the American Mathematical Society, president of the Mathematical Association of America, a member of the National Science Board and a member of both the National Academy of Sciences and the American Philosophical Society.

Life and career 
McShane was born and raised in New Orleans.
He received his bachelor of engineering and Bachelor of Science degrees from Tulane University in 1925, following with a M.S. degree from Tulane in 1927.
McShane received his Ph.D. in mathematics from the University of Chicago.
He taught at the University of Virginia for 39 years until he retired in 1974. His doctoral students include Victor Klee, Billy James Pettis, and David Lowdenslager, who collaborated with Henry Helson.
McShane died of congestive heart failure at the University of Virginia hospital.

Selected publications

Articles
 
 
 
  (over 650 citations)

Books

as translator

References

External links

MAA presidents: Edward James McShane

1904 births
1989 deaths
20th-century American mathematicians
Tulane University alumni
University of Virginia faculty
University of Chicago alumni
Members of the United States National Academy of Sciences
Presidents of the Mathematical Association of America
Presidents of the American Mathematical Society
Members of the American Philosophical Society